Peter Farquhar Gardiner-Hill (born 22 October 1926) is an English former first-class cricketer.

The son of Harold Gardiner-Hill and Margaret Helen Buzzard, he was born at Westminster in October 1926. He was educated at Eton College, before going up to Christ Church, Oxford. While studying at Oxford, he made two appearances in first-class cricket for Oxford University against Sussex and Middlesex in 1949. He scored a half century against Middlesex. Gardiner-Hill later served as captain and president of the President's Putter.

References

External links

1926 births
Living people
People from Westminster
People educated at Eton College
Alumni of Christ Church, Oxford
English cricketers
Oxford University cricketers